Deep Garden is a 1987 Taiwanese mystery TV drama series based on romance novelist Chiung Yao's 1969 novel. The series was produced by Chiung Yao's husband Ping Hsin-tao and first shown on Chinese Television System. The title is taken from an 11th-century poem by Ouyang Xiu, which happens to be the favorite line of the mysterious female protagonist.

This series was one of the biggest hits in 1980s Taiwan. In Hong Kong it was broadcast on Asia Television. In Singapore it was shown on Singapore Broadcasting Corporation. In Vietnam it was shown as Xóm vắng ("Deserted Hamlet").

Cast
Leanne Liu as Fang Ssu-ying (real identity: Chang Han-yen), Ting-ting's mother
Chin Han as Po Pei-wen
Ku Yin as Ou Ai-ling, Po Pei-wen's wife
Yu Chen-hua as Ting-ting, Po Pei-wen's daughter
Chao Yung-hsin as Yu Tsui-shan
Lee Li-feng as Po Pei-wen's mother
Lee Tien-chu as Ou Kuan-chung, Ou Ai-ling's brother
Sun Shu-fen as Ya-chu
Hsu Wen-chuan as Mr. You
Chang Pao-shan as Mr. Chang
Wang Li as Tsai-feng
Lin Tzay-peir as Chien Fei-fan (real identity: Po Pei-te), Po Pei-wen's half-brother
Wen Chieh as Chien Meng-ko
Hsu Nai-lin as Cheng Ya-li
Chu Huei-chen as Yeh Shuang
Fan Hung-hsuan as Kao Li-te
Sung Yi-fang as Lee Yu-sheng
Jin Chao-chun as Po Yun-sheng, Po Pei-wen's father (flashback)
Liu Fang-ying as Chu Chiu-ho, Chien Fei-fan's mother (flashback)
Feng Hai as Chien Ming-yuan, Chien Fei-fan's adoptive father (flashback)
Lee Yu-lin as Hsia Yun-lung (flashback)
Yu Heng as Hsia Chin-hui, Hsia Yun-lung's father (flashback)
Ma Huei-chen as Lee Chun-man, Hsia Yun-lung's mother (flashback)
Ma Wei-hsun as Tsai Chin-hua (flashback)
Yang Wen-yu as Yen Li-li (flashback)

Awards and nominations
1988 Golden Bell Awards
Won—Best Actress (Ku Yin)
Nominated—Best TV Series
Nominated—Best Writing (Chiung Yao and Lin Chiu-yu)
Nominated—Best Actress (Leanne Liu)
Nominated—Best Actor (Chin Han)

References

External links

1987 Taiwanese television series debuts
1987 Taiwanese television series endings
Mandarin-language television shows
Television shows set in Taiwan
Taiwanese romance television series
Chinese Television System original programming
Television shows based on works by Chiung Yao
1980s romance television series
1980s Taiwanese television series